Dorcas Ruth Hardy (July 18, 1946 – November 28, 2019) was a former federal government official. Hardy served as the 10th Commissioner of the United States Social Security Administration (SSA) from 1986 to 1989. She was the first woman to serve as SSA Commissioner.

Early life and education
Hardy was born in Newark, New Jersey on July 18, 1946, the daughter of C Colburn and Ruth E. Hardy. She graduated from Miss Beard's School in Orange, New Jersey (now Morristown-Beard School) in 1964. Hardy completed her bachelor's degree at Connecticut College in 1968 and her Master of Business Administration degree at Pepperdine University in 1976. She then finished the Executive Program in Health Policy and Financial Management at Harvard University.

Government service
President Ronald Reagan nominated Hardy as SSA Commissioner on March 20, 1986. She began serving in the position later that year after Senate confirmation hearings in May. Hardy then served as SSA Commissioner through the beginning of the  George H. W. Bush Presidential Administration. During the Reagan Administration, Hardy also served as Assistant Secretary for Human Development Services at the U.S. Department of Health and Human Services (1981-1986). She served as Assistant Secretary for Health of the California Health and Welfare Agency (1973-1974) during Reagan's governorship. 

Hardy chaired the U.S. Department of Veterans Affairs' Task Force on Vocational Rehabilitation and Employment in 2004 and the Policy Committee of the White House Conference on Aging in 2005. As of 2013, she served on the seven-member Social Security Advisory Board (SSAB). The SSAB advises the President, the U.S. Congress, and the Social Security Commissioner on policies for Social Security and Supplemental Security Income.

Private sector activities
Hardy headed the Health Services Industry Committee of the Cost of Living Council as its executive director from 1971 to 1973. Between 1974 and 1981, she served as the Associate Director of the Center for Health Services Research at the University of Southern California. Hardy has also served as Chairman and CEO of Work Recovery Inc., a rehabilitation technology firm in Tucson, Arizona. In 2011, she received appointment to the Board of Visitors of the University of Mary Washington in Fredericksburg, Virginia. Hardy has also served on the Board of Directors of First Coast Service Options Inc., a Medicare contractor, Wright Investors Service Managed Fund, and Options Clearing Corporation.

Hardy previously hosted Financing Your Future, a weekly television program that aired in primetime on Financial News Network and UPI Broadcasting. She also hosted The Senior American, a political magazine TV show that aired on NET.

Honors and awards
The National Coalition of Hispanic Mental Health and Human Services awarded Hardy their National Humanitarian Award. National Hispanic University in East San Jose, California awarded her their Thomas Rivera Award.

Death
She died on November 28, 2019, in Spotsylvania County, Virginia at age 73.

References

1946 births
2019 deaths
Burials at Quantico National Cemetery
Commissioners of the Social Security Administration
Connecticut College alumni
George H. W. Bush administration personnel
Harvard University alumni
Morristown-Beard School alumni
New Jersey Republicans
Pepperdine University alumni
Politicians from Newark, New Jersey
Reagan administration personnel